is a city located in Osaka Prefecture, Japan. , the city had an estimated population of 142,655 in 73353 households and a population density of 11,000 persons per km².

Geography
Moriguchi borders the northeastern part of Osaka City and faces the Yodo River on the north. It is formed in a "U" shape around Kadoma City. Originally, there were many low-lying areas and many lotus root fields, but the area is now almost completely urbanized.

Surrounding municipalities
Osaka Prefecture
Osaka (Higashiyodogawa-ku, Asahi-ku, Tsurumi-ku)
 Settsu
 Kadoma
 Neyagawa

Climate
Moriguchi has a Humid subtropical climate (Köppen Cfa) characterized by warm summers and cool winters with light to no snowfall.  The average annual temperature in Moriguchi is 15.6 °C. The average annual rainfall is 1475 mm with September as the wettest month. The temperatures are highest on average in August, at around 27.7 °C, and lowest in January, at around 4.2 °C.

Demographics
Per Japanese census data, the population of Moriguchi rose rapidly to the 1970s,and has since started a slow decline.

History
The area of the modern city of Moriguchi was within ancient Kawachi Province. The place name "Moriguchi" first appears in historical records in 1373.  In the Edo Period, Moriguchi-juku was a post station on the Ōsaka Kaidō, an extension of the Tōkaidō between Kyoto and Kōraibashi in Osaka. The town of Moriguchi was established within Matta District with the creation of the modern municipalities system on April 1, 1889.  On April 1, 1896 the area became part of Kitakawachi District, Osaka. The town of Izumi was created on April 1, 1933 by the merger of Kokufu,Gosho and Hakata. On November 1, 1946 Moriguchi merged with the town of Sango to form the city of Moriguchi.

Government
Moriguchi has a mayor-council form of government with a directly elected mayor and a unicameral city council of 22 members. Moriguchi contributes one member to the Osaka Prefectural Assembly. In terms of national politics, the city is part of Osaka 6th district of the lower house of the Diet of Japan.

Economy
Moriguchi is a satellite city to Osaka, with a large percentage of the local population commuting to the Osaka metropolis for work. The head offices and factory of Panasonic and its subsidiary Sanyo straddle the border of Moriguchi and neighboring Kadoma, which has attracted many there are many subcontracting parts companies.

Education
Moriguchi has 13 public elementary schools, seven public middle schools and one  combined elementary/middle school operated by the city government and three public high school operated by the Osaka Prefectural Department of Education. There are also three private high schools. The prefecture also operates one special education school for the handicapped. Two private colleges,  Kansai Medical University and Osaka International University  are located in Moriguchi.

Transportation

Railway
 Keihan Electric Railway – Keihan Main Line
  -  - 
 Osaka Metro -  Tanimachi Line
  - 
 Osaka Monorail - Main Line

Highway
  Kinki Expressway
  Hanshin Expressway Moriguchi Route

Sister and friendship city relations 
  Tōyō, Kōchi, Japan - Friendship city agreement concluded in 1981
  Takashima, Shiga, Japan - Friendship city agreement concluded in 1981 (with former Adogawa town)
  Katsuragi, Wakayama, Japan - Friendship city agreement concluded in 2005 (with former Hanazono town)
  New Westminster, British Columbia, Canada - Sister city agreement concluded in 1963
  Zhongshan, Guangdong, China - Friendship city agreement concluded in 1988

Local attractions
Moriguchi-juku

Notable people from Moriguchi
 Ayaka, musician
Ryoji Morimoto, actor

References

External links

 Moriguchi City official website 

Cities in Osaka Prefecture
Moriguchi, Osaka